Vaughn Wiester (born July 11, 1945) is an American jazz musician and educator. He has led his own big band, the Famous Jazz Orchestra.

References

1945 births
Living people
American jazz trombonists
Male trombonists
People from Mount Vernon, Ohio
Jazz musicians from Ohio
21st-century trombonists
21st-century American male musicians
American male jazz musicians